Parque Enrique Lage is a public park in the city of Rio de Janeiro, located in the Jardim Botânico neighborhood at the foot of the Corcovado, on top of which Christ the Redeemer is located.

The land was formerly the residence of industrialist Henrique Lage and his wife, singer Gabriella Besanzoni. During the 1920s, Lage had the mansion remodeled by Italian architect Mario Vodret, with interior paintings by Salvador Payols Sabaté. 

The National Historical and Artistic Heritage Institute (IPHAN) listed Parque Lage, on June 14 1957, as a historical and cultural heritage site for the city of Rio de Janeiro.

In the 1960s, the land became a public park, with walking trails through subtropical forest. The Escola de Artes Visuais do Parque Lage (Visual Arts School of Parque Lage) and a café open to the public operate from the former mansion.

The mansion was used as the British Olympic Team hospitality house and is notably featured in the 2003 music video for Snoop Dogg's single "Beautiful".

References

External links

 Escola de Artes Visuais do Parque Lage
 Plage Cafe
 Instituto Terra Brasil
 Parque Lage to Christ the Redeemer

Parks in Rio de Janeiro (city)